Dave Campbell may refer to:

 Dave Campbell (American football) (1873–1949), American football player
 Dave Campbell (Canadian football) (born c. 1951), Canadian football player
 Dave Campbell (ice hockey) (1896–1975), Canadian hockey defenceman
 Dave Campbell (basketball) (1925–2015), Canadian basketball player
 Dave Campbell (infielder) (born 1942), American baseball infielder and broadcaster
 Dave Campbell (pitcher) (born 1951), American baseball pitcher
 Dave Campbell (footballer, born 1969), Irish soccer player
 Dave Campbell (footballer, born 1947) (1947–2013), Welsh footballer 
 Dave Campbell, sportswriter and founder of American football magazine Dave Campbell's Texas Football

See also
 David Campbell (disambiguation)